Fotuhabad may refer to:
 Fotuhabad, Marvdasht
 Fotuhabad, Shiraz